Tutti is a studio album by English musician Cosey Fanni Tutti. It was released on 8 February 2019 through Conspiracy International.

Track listing

Charts

References

2019 albums